This is a list of seasons completed by the Milwaukee Mustangs. The Mustangs were a professional arena football franchise based in Milwaukee, Wisconsin. The team was established in 2009 as the Milwaukee Iron. They changed their name to the Milwaukee Mustangs prior to the 2011 season. They played in the af2 in 2009 and in the Arena Football League from 2010 to 2012. They made the playoffs once.

References
General
 
 
 

Arena Football League seasons by team
 
Wisconsin sports-related lists